Gangsta Bitch Music, Vol. 1 is the debut mixtape by American rapper Cardi B. It was released on March 7, 2016, by KSR. 
Cardi B has been sued by a model for allegedly using his image on the mixtape's cover artwork without his permission. On October 21, 2022, a jury found in favor of Cardi B.

Track listing

Cover art
The album's cover, designed by graphic artist Timm Gooden, depicts Cardi B receiving a cunnilingus in the car from a tattooed man "Kevin Brophy Jr." while drinking from a bottle of Corona Extra beer. The image is actually a photomontage in which a tattoo belonging to Kevin Brophy Jr. was digitally composited onto the body of the uncredited male model who posed for the photo; Brophy later claimed that tattoo image was used without his permission and that his likeness was appropriated in "a misleading, offensive, humiliating and provocatively sexual humiliating way". Brophy has filed suit in California over the unauthorized use of his image, and in December 2020 the court rejected Cardi B's motion for summary judgment on the basis of fair use, sending the case to a jury.On October 21, 2022, Jury declared its verdict siding with Cardi B, and clearing her from the copyright infringement allegations.

Charts

References

2016 mixtape albums
Cardi B albums
Debut mixtape albums